Emelie Fast (born 20 February 2004) is a Swedish swimmer. She competed in the women's 200 metre breaststroke event at the 2020 European Aquatics Championships, in Budapest, Hungary. In 2021, she represented Sweden at the 2020 Summer Olympics held in Tokyo, Japan. She competed in the women's 100 metre breaststroke event. She competed at the 2021 FINA World Swimming Championships (25 m).

References

External links
 

2004 births
Living people
Swedish female breaststroke swimmers
Place of birth missing (living people)
Swimmers at the 2020 Summer Olympics
Olympic swimmers of Sweden
21st-century Swedish women